Bengai is a village  in the Goghat II CD block in the Arambagh subdivision of the Hooghly district in the Indian state of West Bengal.

Geography

Location

Area overview
The Arambagh subdivision, presented in the map alongside, is divided into two physiographic parts – the Dwarakeswar River being the dividing line. The western part is upland and rocky – it is extension of the terrain of neighbouring Bankura district. The eastern part is flat alluvial plain area.  The railways, the roads and flood-control measures have had an impact on the area. The area is overwhelmingly rural with 94.77% of the population living in rural areas and 5.23% of the population living in urban areas.

Note: The map alongside presents some of the notable locations in the subdivision. All places marked in the map are linked in the larger full screen map.

Demographics
According to the 2011 Census of India, Bengai had a total population of 4,674 of which 2,374 (51%) were males and 2,300 (49%) were females. Population in the age range 0–6 years was 468. The total number of literate persons in Bengai was 3,312 (78.74% of the population over 6 years).

Education
Aghorekamini Prakashchandra Mahavidyalaya, a general degree college, was established at Bengai in 1959. It is affiliated with the University of Burdwan. The following subjects are taught: Bengali, English, Sanskrit, Santali, history, geography, philosophy, political science, economics, physical education, music, physics, chemistry, mathematics and commerce. The college has hostel facilities. Also there is Bengai High School, Bengai Girls' High School, Subhasnagar ITI, Sarat Vidyapith, Swami Vivekananda Institute of Education (B.Ed College), Vivekananda Institute of Education (B.Ed College).

Bengai High School is very popularly known for Agriculture education in 10+2 level since 1958 till the date.

Teachers like Dr. Nisith Baran Hazra lives there.

References

Villages in Hooghly district